Peter McLaren (born 1948) is a Canadian scholar who serves as a Distinguished Professor in Critical Studies at Attallah College of Educational Studies, Chapman University, where he is Co-Director of the Paulo Freire Democratic Project and International Ambassador for Global Ethics and Social Justice. He is also Emeritus Professor of Urban Education, University of California, Los Angeles, and Emeritus Professor of Educational Leadership, Miami University of Ohio. He is also the Honorary Director of the Center for Critical Studies in Education at Northeast Normal University, Changchun, China. According to Stanford University's database, McLaren belongs to the top 2% of the world’s most influential scientists.

McLaren is the author and editor of over forty-five books and hundreds of scholarly articles and chapters. His writings have been translated into over 20 languages. He is married to Yan Wang from Northeast China. They currently live in Orange, California. He has a son and daughter from previous marriages.

McLaren is known as one of the leading architects of critical pedagogy, and for his scholarly writings on critical literacy, the sociology of education, cultural studies, critical ethnography, and Marxist theory. Paulo Freire, a founding figure of critical pedagogy, stated: "Peter McLaren is one among the many outstanding 'intellectual relatives' I 'discovered' and by whom I in turn was 'discovered.' I read Peter McLaren long before I ever came to know him personally. ... Once I finished reading the first texts by McLaren that were made available to me, I was almost certain that we belonged to an identical 'intellectual family'."

During a keynote address at Chapman University on October 25, 2014, Nita Freire, eminent educational scholar and widow of Paulo Freire, remarked: "It is ... a huge thrill for me to see Peter McLaren and Donaldo Macedo, who ever since through discussions and dialogue became old friends of work and friendship, partners of ideological and theoretical ideas of Paulo. They along with Henry Giroux formulated the critical pedagogy as we know of today."

McLaren has worked with Abahlali baseMjondolo, in South Africa; the landless workers' movement, Movimento dos Trabalhadores Rurais Sem Terra – MST, in Brasil, the Zapatistas in Mexico, and members of the Bolivarian revolution in Venezuela, and with the left education workers union in Turkey where amid a demonstration he was teargassed and hurled to the ground by a police's riot shield.

McLaren is a faculty member at the Institute of Critical Pedagogy at The Global Center for Advanced Studies and lectures worldwide on education's politics. In Finland, he gave an Opening Lecture at Paulo Freire Center–Finland on November 20, 2007. La Escuela Normal Superior de Neiva in Colombia has named one of its buildings after Peter McLaren.

, McLaren is ranked in the top 15 percent of all social science and humanities scholars in the world, based on his D-index (Discipline H-index); he is ranked 217 in the United States and 428 in the world.

Life
Peter McLaren was born in Toronto, Ontario, on August 2, 1948, and raised in Toronto and also, for four years, in Winnipeg, Manitoba. He is the only child of Frances Teresa Bernadette McLaren and Lawrence Omand McLaren, from Canada. McLaren's early family life was working-class until his father, a Second World War war veteran with the Royal Canadian Engineers, returned from battle in Europe and began work as a television salesman, eventually rising to the rank of General Manager of Phillips Electronics, Eastern Canada. McLaren's mother was a homemaker before working as a telephone operator.

McLaren used to read voraciously in literature, philosophy, poetry, social theory, and literary and art criticism, was making creative 35 mm movies at 16, and dreamt of being an artist or film director. McLaren's father had one sister, Bonnie, who married Terry Goddard, a Second World War Royal Air Force pilot credited with helping sink the German battleship Bismark. McLaren's mother had four sisters and two brothers. McLaren compensated for being an only child by spending time with his many cousins and engaging in creative writing. McLaren's first writing award was during middle school, where he won top writing honours by producing a science fiction story.

At 19, McLaren hitchhiked throughout the US, met with Black Panthers in Oakland, lived in San Francisco and Los Angeles, where he participated in anti–Vietnam War protests, met with Timothy Leary and Allen Ginsberg and began writing poetry and short stories. His first commercial publication was about his great Aunt, Irma Wright, who won the world's fastest typist competition in 1928.

He earned a Bachelor of Arts in English literature at University of Waterloo in 1973 (specializing in Elizabethan drama), attended Toronto Teachers College, and went on to earn a Bachelor of Education at the University of Toronto's Faculty of Education, a Masters of Education at Brock University's College of Education, and a Ph.D. at the Ontario Institute for Studies in Education, the University of Toronto (where he worked with the late Richard Courtney, a leading international authority in children's drama).

McLaren taught elementary and middle school from 1974-1979. Most of that time was spent teaching in Canada's largest public housing complex in Toronto's Jane-Finch Corridor. Cries from the Corridor, McLaren's book about his teaching experiences, made the Canadian bestseller list and was one of top ten bestselling books in Canada in 1980 (Maclean's magazine, the Toronto Star), initiating a country-wide debate on inner-city schools. (Later, McLaren would harshly criticize this book and go on to transform it into the highly acclaimed pedagogical text, Life in Schools.)

After earning his doctorate in 1983, he served as Special Lecturer in Education at Brock University, where, as a one-year sabbatical replacement, he specialized in inner-city education and language arts. After the Dean did not follow through on his promised extension of McLaren's contract, McLaren decided to pursue an academic appointment in the United States. However, he remains on good terms with the faculty at Brock University, with whom he remains in a relationship of solidarity and friendship.

McLaren left Canada in 1985 to teach at Miami University's School of Education and Allied Professions, where he spent eight years working with colleague Henry Giroux during a time when the epistemology known as critical pedagogy was gaining traction in North American schools of education. McLaren also served as Director of the Center for Education and Cultural Studies and held the title of Renowned Scholar-in-Residence at Miami University before being recruited by the Graduate School of Education and Information Studies, University of California, Los Angeles, in 1993.

In 2013, McLaren was appointed Distinguished Fellow in Critical Studies at Chapman University, Orange, California.

In 2019, The Griffith Journal of Law and Human Dignity, affiliated with the top-ranked law school in Australia, published an extensive interview with McLaren. And the same year the OC Weekly featured commentary on two articles featured by McLaren on the fight against fascism in the United States, and McLaren published a graphic novel of his life with an artist Miles Wilson.

Career

First phase, 1980–1993
The theoretical orientations of the first ten years of McLaren's research and writing can be traced to his early undergraduate work in Elizabethan drama, theater arts, and from there to his graduate studies in symbolic anthropology, critical ethnography and social semiotics. As a young man, McLaren had always admired the life and work of William Morris author, poet, artist and craftsman, printer and calligrapher, formidable socialist and activist, businessman and private individual. At the time that he enrolled in doctoral studies at the University of Toronto's Ontario Institute for Studies in Education (Institut d'Etudes Pedagogiques de L'Ontario), Victor Turner, the world-renowned symbolic anthropologist, was conducting path breaking transdisciplinary work at the University of Virginia, bringing dramaturgical theory and anthropology into close collaboration, particularly as this applied to the study of ritual. McLaren soon became a scholar of Turner's work. After auditing a course at the Toronto Semiotics Institute taught by philosopher Michel Foucault, and another by Umberto Eco, McLaren began to develop a transdisciplinary approach to the study of ritual.  He found a rich transdisciplinary milieu in which to conduct his studies at Massey College, University of Toronto. Modeled after Balliol College, Oxford University, England, Massey College facilitates interdisciplinary collaboration among high achieving graduate students from various departments on campus. Looking back at his educational experiences at Massey, it is not surprising that the work of performance theorists, political economists, anthropologists, dramaturgical theorists, literary critics, and symbolic interactionists informed the theoretical basis of his first major scholarly publication, Schooling as a Ritual Performance Towards a Political Economy of Educational Symbols and Gestures (first edition, Routledge, 1986; revised editions, 1994, 1997) which was based on his PhD dissertation.

McLaren's early work from 1984 to 1994 spanned diverse intellectual and empirical terrains.  He remained steadfast in his interest in the contemporary themes of the Frankfurt School: social psychology in the context of a lack of revolutionary social protest in Europe and the United States; a critique of positivism and science; developing a critical theory of art and representation; an interrogation of the mass media and mass culture; investigating the production of desire and identity; and the globalization of capitalism and forms of integration in neoliberal societies. In other words, when viewed against the major themes of the Frankfurt School, there was a fundamental coherence to his work as a whole.

Further, each of McLaren's scholarly projects attempted to explore the construction of identity in school contexts within a neo-liberal society. This meant engaging in numerous critical projects: exploring the debilitating effects of logical positivism in the social sciences and the assault on critical theory and critical ethnography; exploring the increasing colonization of the lifeworld by the mass media and developing a critical pedagogy of media literacy and a political aesthetics of pedagogical experience; analyzing the decline of critical rationality in postmodern societies and the development of critical literacies; advancing in specific pedagogical terms the struggle to redefine the meaning of liberation and empowerment in an age of despair and cynicism; investigating the politics of post-liberal societies with specific reference to the practices of cultural racism and sexism, and developing an analysis of the production, distribution, consumption, and exchange of cultural objects in schools and larger social sites with an emphasis on the social construction of subjectivity.

In this early period, McLaren's research emphasized the development of a critical emancipatory consciousness, self-conscious reason, and the centrality of nonidentity thinking towards a non essentialist view of revolutionary consciousness grounded in a theory of intersubjective understanding through language. Practically, his work attempted to create an oppositional cultural politics that enabled teachers and students to analyze how the dominant and negotiated meanings that inform classroom texts were produced and to uncover the ideological and political meanings that circulated within them. McLaren attempted through critical reading strategies to illuminate the dominant pedagogical codes of teachers as well as the normative codes within classroom cultures of students. His purpose was to create alternative readings as well as new pedagogical practices. In this sense, critical pedagogy, as McLaren was formulating it, attempted to re engage a social world that operates under the assumption of its collective autonomy and so remains resistant to human intervention.

In his early work, McLaren engaged four main strands in educational theory and studies: critical ethnography, critical pedagogy, curriculum studies and critical multiculturalism.

Second phase, 1994–present

McLaren work during the past several decades is not so much a break from his early work, as an extension of it.  A discernible shift occurred in the sense that he now focuses more on a critique of political economy.  But his early work also included a critique of capitalism, except during that time McLaren operated from primarily a Weberian understanding of class and was concerned at that time with the politics of consumption and lifestyle/identity. McLaren's new turn saw him focus on the social relations of production and its relation to the production of subjectivity and protagonist agency. Between 1994 up to the present, McLaren's work is less directed at the classroom per se, and more focused on issues such as a critique of political economy, cultural contact and racial identity, anti-racist/multicultural education, the politics of white supremacy, resistance and popular culture; the formation of subjectivity, the coloniality of power and decolonial education; revolutionary critical pedagogy informed by a Marxist humanist analysis and liberation theology.

During this time McLaren began spending time in Latin America – working with Chavistas in Venezuela and with labor and union leaders in Mexico and Colombia and becoming more interested in Marxist critique of political economy. McLaren came to believe  that postmodern theory could be quite a reactionary approach in so far as it failed to challenge with the verve and sustained effort that is demanded of the times the social relations of capitalist production and reproduction. While McLaren adopted the term, critical postmodernism, or resistance postmodernism, to describe his work up until the late 1990s, he recognized that he needed to engage the work of Karl Marx and Marxist thinkers.

The more McLaren began engaging in the work of Marx, and meeting social activists driven by Marxist anti-imperialist projects throughout the Americas, he no longer believed that the work on "radical democracy" convincingly demonstrated that it was superior to the Marxist problematic. It appeared to McLaren that, in the main, such work had despairingly capitulated to the inevitability of the rule of capital and the regime of the commodity. That work, along with much of the work in post-colonialist criticism, appeared to McLaren as too detached from historical specificities and basic determinations. McLaren believed that Marxist critique more adequately addressed the differentiated totalities of contemporary society and their historical imbrications in the world system of global capitalism. Rather than employ the term critical pedagogy, McLaren now uses the term that the British educator Paula Allman has christened revolutionary critical pedagogy. McLaren describes his current work as Marxist humanist, a term developed by Raya Dunayevskaya, who once served as Trotsky's secretary in Mexico and who developed the tradition of Marxist humanism in the US. McLaren's work constitutes counterpoint to the way social justice is used in progressive education by inviting students to examine critically the epistemological and axiological dimensions of democracy in the light of a Marxist critique of political economy and the coloniality of power (a term developed by Anibal Quijano). McLaren's work today comprises poetry, reflections on his activist work in Venezuela, Mexico, and other countries, contributions to critical theory, and Marxist analysis as applied to current educational policy and reform initiatives.

Although McLaren's theoretical work has developed in these stages, the preface to the most recent compilation of his oeuvre argues that these phases aren't distinguished by theoretical breaks but by political "maturation." This latest interpretation argues that there are two continuities throughout his phases. The first is his effort to create new temporalities, spatialities, subjectivities, and modes of production that don't entail exploitation and oppression. The second is that this pursuit has always been "rooted not in the transcendence of the ideal, but in the immanence of corporeal reality."

McLaren's critical pedagogy
McLaren's work has broken new ground in education. He is considered one of the architects of critical pedagogy, having been influenced early in his career by Paulo Freire and Henry Giroux. He also has been credited with laying the groundwork for performance studies in education with the publication of his book, Schooling as a Ritual Performance. The Peter McLaren Upstander Lecture was recently announced as part of the Annual International Critical Research in Applied Theater Symposium, Auckland, New Zealand.  The lecture is to  be presented each year by a graduate student in education from the School of Critical Studies in Education at the University of Auckland. Currently McLaren is known as one of the leading exponents of revolutionary critical pedagogy, an approach to everyday life influenced by Marxist humanist philosophy, also known as a "philosophy of praxis".  McLaren's work is controversial for its uncompromising politics of class struggle. McLaren is also a gifted orator and social activist, and his academic writing has been both praised and criticized for its unique blend of poetry and literary tropes and cutting-edge theoretical analysis. At least one documentary is in the planning about McLaren's life.

McLaren approaches critical pedagogy as a praxiological effort to develop a politics of everyday life in a number of ways. First, it situates its critical analyses within the realms of popular culture. Secondly, it pays close theoretical attention to the ways in which everyday discourses and social practices both constitute and reinforce relations of power as well as serve as sites for struggle, resistance, and transformation. Thirdly, critical pedagogy as developed by McLaren attempts to seize opportunities to make links between new social movements and the networks of power associated with "school life". It does this by attempting to link the micropolitical (everyday lives of teachers and students) with the macropolitical (larger economic, cultural, social, and institutional structures).

Critical pedagogy, as McLaren develops it, seeks to analyze the possibilities for the resistance and transformation of social life, both individual and collective, personal and macropolitical. It engages in such an analysis by attempting to understand how wider relations of power are played out in the agential spaces of classroom and community life but also by attempting to investigate how wider structures of mediation at the level of the economy are able to "take root" in the everyday lives of students and teachers who operate at the level of common sense actions. This means constantly reflecting on the cultural construction of the identities of teachers, students, researchers and also connecting such critical reflection to a wider terrain of political action and class struggle. McLaren takes critical pedagogy beyond a discursive politics that sees politics as merely a text to be deconstructed and interpreted. Instead, McLaren approaches cultural politics as a terrain that operationalizes the textuality of political life by linking textuality to materiality. That is, McLaren seeks to make connections between the texts that we read (cultural artifacts) and those that read us (the realm of language and discursive structures in general) in light of current modes and social relations of production and the political consequences that these connections bring about in our pedagogies, curricula, and policies.

Since 1994, McLaren revised and extended some of his earlier insights in Schooling as a Ritual Performance, and Life in Schools, and other works, through an engagement with Marx and leading Marxist philosophers and theorists.

While anti-capitalist struggle and Marxist analysis has an indistinct and relatively undigested place in the field of educational theory, there is some movement towards Marx in the social sciences here in North America. Marx is being revisited by social scientists of all disciplinary shapes and sizes – even, and perhaps most especially and urgently today, when capitalism is in a state of severe crisis. While hardly on their way to becoming entrenched and pervasive, Marx's ideas are taking their significance most strikingly from the particular and varied contexts in which his ideas are being engaged.  Thank to McLaren's work, Marx's ideas are gaining traction in education.

In McLaren's post-1994 phase, Marxist theory has provided McLaren with an approach to praxis that is fundamentally necessary to better contextualize changes in the socio-political and economic sphere as it relates to education. Through McLaren's current reengagement with Marx, and the tradition of historical materialism, McLaren supports the work of  colleagues whose work is paving the way for new generations of educationalists to encounter Marx. Marx is being reevaluated on numerous fronts today: sociology, political science, philosophy, economics, ethics, history, and the like.

Bibliography
McLaren is the author, co-author, editor, and co-editor of approximately forty books and monographs. Several hundred of his articles, chapters, interviews, reviews, commentaries, and columns have appeared in dozens of scholarly journals and professional magazines worldwide.

His most recent books include:
 McLaren, P. (2020). He walks Among Us: Christian Fascism Ushering in the End of Days. DIO Press.
 McLaren, P. & Jandric, P. (2020). Postdigital Dialogues on Critical Pedagogy, Liberation Theology and Information Technology. Bloomsbury Academic.
 McLaren, P. & Wilson, M. (2019). Breaking Free: The Life and Times of Peter McLaren, Radical Educator. Myers Education Press.
 McLaren, P. (2016). Pedagogy of Insurrection: From Resurrection to Revolution. Peter Lang.
 McLaren, P., Macrine, S., and Hill, D, (Eds). (2010). Revolutionizing Pedagogy: Educating for Social Justice Within and Beyond Global Neo-liberalism. Palgrave Macmillan.
 Nocella, A., Best, S., & McLaren, P. (Eds.) (2010). Academic Repression: Reflections from the Academic Industrial Complex. AK Press.
 Martin, G., Houston, D., McLaren, P. & Suoranta, J. (Eds.) (2010) Havoc of Capitalism. Educating for Social and Environmental Justice. Sense Publishers.
 Sandlin, J.A. & McLaren, P. (Eds.). (2009). Critical Pedagogies of Consumption: Living and Learning in the Shadow of the "Shopocalypse". Routledge.
 McLaren, P. & Jaramillo, N. (2007). Pedagogy and Praxis in the Age of Empire. Sense Publishers.
 McLaren, P. (2006). Rage + Hope. Peter Lang.
 McLaren, P. (2005). Capitalists and Conquerors. Rowman and Littlefield.
 McLaren, P. & Farahmandpur,'R. (2005) Teaching Against Global Capitalism and the New Imperialism. Rowman and Littlefield.
 McLaren, P. (2005). Red Seminars: Radical Excursions into Educational Theory, Cultural Politics, and Pedagogy. Hampton Press.
 McLaren, P., D. Hill, M. Cole, & G. Rikowski (2002). Marxism  Against Postmodernism in Educational Theory. Lexington Books.
 McLaren, P. (2000). Che Guevara, Paulo Freire, and the Pedagogy of Revolution. Rowman and Littlefield.
 McLaren, P. (1997). Revolutionary Multiculturalism: Pedagogies of Dissent for the New Millennium. Westview Press.
 McLaren, P., H. Giroux, C. Lankshear & M. Peters (1997). Counternarratives. Routledge.
 McLaren, P. (1995). Critical Pedagogy and Predatory Culture. Routledge.

He is also author of Life in Schools: An Introduction to Critical Pedagogy in the Foundations of Education (Allyn & Bacon) which is in its fifth edition (2006).  Life in Schools has been named one of the 12 most significant writings worldwide in the field of educational theory, policy and practice] by an international panel of experts assembled by the Moscow School of Social and Economic Sciences; other writers named by the panel include Paulo Freire, Ivan Illich, and Pierre Bourdieu. In 2011, Instituto Peter McLaren was established in Ensenada, Mexico.

McLaren's work has been the subject of three recent books: Teaching Peter McLaren: Paths of Dissent, edited by Marc Pruyn and Luis M. Huerta-Charles (Peter Lang, 2005) [translated into Spanish as De La Pedagogia Critica a la pedagogia de la Revolucion: Ensayos Para Comprender a Peter McLaren, Mexico City, Siglo Veintiuno Editores], Peter McLaren, Education, and the Struggle for Liberation, edited by Mustafa Eryaman (Hampton Press, 2008), and Crisis of Commonwealth: Marcuse, Marx, McLaren, edited by Charles Reitz (Lexington Books, 2013).

McLaren has also recently debuted as a poet with his poem "The Despoiling of the American Mind" in MRZine. His works have been praised, among others, by Slavoj Žižek and Paula Allman. Žižek comments McLaren's book Che Guevara, Paulo Freire and the Pedagogy of Revolution as follows: "Che Guevara is usually perceived as a Romantic model whom we should admire, while pursuing our daily business as usual – the most perverse defense against what Che stood for. What McLaren's fascinating book demonstrates is that, on the contrary, Che is a model for our times, a figure we should imitate in our struggle against neoliberal global capitalism." Allman notes that the book is "brilliant blend of passion, commitment, and critical analysis and insight. ... It is also one of the most important books on critical education, and thus also education and social justice, to have been written in the twentieth century."

Recent developments

Honorary doctorates
Peter McLaren was awarded an honorary doctorate by the University of Lapland, Finland, in 2004, by Universidad del Salvador, Buenos Aires, Argentina, in 2010, by the Universidad Nacional de Chilecito in La Rioja, Argentina, and the Centro de Estudios Latinoamericanos de Educación Inclusiva (CELEI), Chile, in 2021. He also received the Amigo Honorifica de la Comunidad Universitaria de esta Institucion by La Universidad Pedagogica Nacional, Unidad 141, Guadalajara, Mexico.

La Fundacion McLaren de Pedagogía Critica
In 2005, a group of scholars and activists in Northern Mexico established La Fundacion McLaren de Pedagogía Critica to develop a knowledge of McLaren's work throughout Mexico and to promote projects in critical pedagogy and popular education. On September 15, 2006 the Catedra Peter McLaren was inaugurated at the Bolivarian University of Venezuela.

See also

 
 Critical consciousness
 Ecopedagogy
 Frantz Fanon
 Liberation psychology
 Post-structuralism
 Praxis intervention
 Praxis school
 Queer pedagogy
 Radical Teacher
 Structuralism
 List of University of Waterloo people

References

Footnotes

Works cited

External links 
Peter McLaren's webpages and CV
 
 Peter McLaren's testimony in the "Cold War Truth Commission" on Sunday, March 21, 2021

Peter McLaren's text
 Toward a Red Theory of Love, Sexuality and the Family by Peter McLaren and Lilia D. Monzo, Iberoamérica Social, December 2014 Issue
 Brothers and Sisters in the Struggle to Rebuild the World by Peter McLaren, Iberoamérica Social, November 2014 Issue
 Austerity/Immiseration Capitalism: What Can We Learn From Venezuelan Socialism? by Peter McLaren and Mike Cole, Iberoamérica Social, May 2014 Issue
 An American Scene by Peter McLaren, Iberoamérica Social, December 2013 Issue
 Living in the Nightwatchman State: A Riposte to Despair by Peter McLaren, Iberoamérica Social, September 2013 Issue
 Rage and Hope by Peter McLaren, Iberoamérica Social, August 2013 Issue
 Che Guevara, Paulo Freire, and the Politics of Hope: Reclaiming Critical Pedagogy - pdf
 George Bush, Apocalypse Sometime Soon, and the American Imperium - pdf
 The Dialectics of Terrorism: A Marxist Response to September 11 - part 1 & part 2
 The Pedagogy of Oppression: A Brief Look at 'No Child Left Behind' by Peter McLaren, Monthly Review, July–August 2006 Issue
Peter McLaren Responds to Bill Ayers: Bad Faith Solidarity January 22, 2007
 Peter McLaren on Paulo Freire in Jacobin magazine

Texts on Peter McLaren
 Peter McLaren Reflects on the Crisis of Academic Freedom by Samuel Day Fassbinder, Monthly Review, April 6, 2006
Educating for Equality by Michael Viola, Monthly Review, November 16, 2006
 Pedagogy and Praxis in the Age of Empire by Samantha Cohen, The Humanities Review, Fall 2007 issue
 Education Professor Peter McLaren Honored with Chair and Foundation by the University of California Newsroom

Interviews
 From liberation to salvation: Revolutionary critical pedagogy meets liberation theology by Petar Jandrić, Policy Futures in Education, 15(5): 620-652, 2017
 Critical Revolutionary Pedagogy is Made by Walking: In a World Where Many Worlds Coexist by Petar Jandrić, Policy Futures in Education, 12(6): 805-831, 2014
 Critical Pedagogy Against Capitalist Schooling: Towards a Socialist Alternative
 A Radical Educator's Views on Media
 Capitalism, Critical Pedagogy, and Urban Science Education
 Educating for Social Justice and Liberation
 Peter McLaren and the Pedagogy of Liberation by Ravi Kumar, Radical Notes, February 19, 2009
 The Role of Critical Pedagogy in the Globalization Era and the Aftermath of September 11
 Towards a Critical Revolutionary Pedagogy December 9, 2003
Revolutionary Critical Pedagogy and the Struggle against Capital Today by Derek R. Ford
 George Yancy interviewed McLaren on his mentor, Paulo Freire, September 27, 2021

1948 births
Living people
Brock University alumni
Canadian activists
Canadian educational theorists
Canadian expatriate academics in the United States
Canadian people of Scottish descent
Marxist humanists
Marxist theorists
Marxist writers
Miami University faculty
Writers from Toronto
UCLA Graduate School of Education and Information Studies faculty
University of Toronto alumni
University of Waterloo alumni
Critical pedagogy